Statistics of Czechoslovak First League in the 1987–88 season. Milan Luhový was the league's top scorer with 24 goals.

Overview
It was contested by 16 teams, and Sparta Prague won the championship.

Stadia and locations

League standings

Results

Top goalscorers

References

Czechoslovakia - List of final tables (RSSSF)

Czechoslovak First League seasons
Czech
1987–88 in Czechoslovak football